Cheongpyeong is a small town about 1 hour east of Seoul, South Korea, in Gapyeong County, Gyeonggi Province. It has a population of approximately 20,000. It is serviced by 3 schools: an elementary, middle and high school.

It is a popular destination for Koreans, especially in summer, as it is on a beautiful lake with dramatic mountains immediately surrounding it, populated by resorts focusing particularly on water sports.   

A retreat nearby taking the name of the town, Cheongpyeong is also the most well-known holy ground of Sun Myung Moon's Unification Church in Korea. Many members of the Unification Church make journeys there on occasion, to attend workshops of spiritual healing and physical exertion at the 10,000 person capacity "Cheongpyeong Heaven and Earth Training Center." The workshops are led by a medium who members believe channels the spirit of Moon's mother-in-law, Soon Ae Hong (who members know by the title Dae Mo Nim, which means "Exalted Mother"). The activities there - chanyang or "praise," ansu are very similar to many Christian groups in Korea with Shamanistic and Pentecostal influences. By the beginning of 1999 more than 250,000 people had participated in workshops in Cheongpyeong.

See also
Geography of South Korea

References

Towns and townships in Gyeonggi Province
Gapyeong County